Drivers that have entered and/or attempted to qualify for the Indianapolis 500, but have never qualified in their entire career, includes drivers that were either bumped, too slow, or incomplete qualifying attempt. Also includes drivers that participated in Rookie Orientation only, as well as drivers that withdrew during practice, or participated in practice, but did not make a qualifying attempt.

 Tony Adamowicz
 Jim Adams
 Chris Amon
 Didier André
 Zora Arkus-Duntov
 Scott Atchison
 Dick Atkins
 Steve Barclay
 Stanton Barrett
 Kevin Bartlett
 Joe Barzda
 Rollie Beale
 Justin Bell
 Ross Bentley
 Merle Bettenhausen
 Lucien Bianchi
 Bob Bondurant
 Neil Bonnett
 Mike Borkowski
 Lindley Bothwell
 Lee Brayton
 Steve Bren
 Bert Brooks
 Jim Buick
 Marvin Burke
 Steve Butler
 Red Byron
 Phil Caliva
 Earle Canavan
 John Cannon
 Rudolf Caracciola
 Ross Cheever
 Chuck Ciprich
 Franco Comotti
 Dale Coyne
 Ed Crombie
 Guido Daccò
 Chuck Daigh
 Paul Dana
 Jorge Daponte
 Luis Díaz
 Doug Didero
 Mario Domínguez
 René Dreyfus
 Dan Drinan
 George Eaton
 Fredrik Ekblom
 Jack Fairman
 Juan Manuel Fangio
 Giuseppe Farina
 Nick Firestone
 John Fitch
 Tom Frantz
 Franck Fréon
 Bob Frey
 Bruno Giacomelli
 Todd Gibson
 Memo Gidley
 Richie Ginther
 Charlie Glotzbach
 Andy Granatelli
 Michael Greenfield
 Perry Grimm
 Olivier Grouillard
 Johnny Hannon
 Johnny Herbert
 Doug Heveron
 Bruce Jacobi
 Ronnie Johncox
 Junior Johnson
 Rupert Keegan
 Ed Kostenuk
 David Kudrave
 Jan Lammers
 Anthony Lazzaro
 Ralph Liguori
 Harry MacDonald
 Jovy Marcelo
 Scott Mayer
 Joe Mazzucco
 Bruce McLaren
 Chip Mead
 Casey Mears
 George Metzler
 Rick Miaskiewicz
 Jerry Miller
 Kenji Momota
 Frank Mundy
 Mike Nish
 Tazio Nuvolari
 Danny Oakes
 Jim Packard
 Carlos Pairetti
 Teddy Pilette
 Pedro Rodríguez
 Michael Roe
 Franco Rol
 Steve Saleen
 Vinicio Salmi
 Harry Sauce
 Ken Schrader
 Ron Shuman
 Leon "Jigger" Sirios
 Al Smith
 Mark Smith
 Jan Sneva
 Joe Sostilio
 Scott Speed
 Mike Spence
 Dave Steele
 Harry Stockman
 Sammy Swindell
 Bill Tempero
 Randy Tolsma
 Ho-Pin Tung
 Curtis Turner
 Achille Varzi
 Dean Vetrock
 John de Vries
 Leroy Warriner
 Frank Weiss
 Desiré Wilson
 Jeff Wood
 John Wood

 Non-q
Indianapolis 500 non-q
Non-qualifying